The 2012 GP3 Series season was the third season of the GP3 Series, a feeder series for the GP2 Series. The season began at Barcelona on 12 May and concluded at Autodromo Nazionale Monza on 9 September after eight rounds made up of two races each and all in support of European Formula One Grands Prix.

The series adopted the points system used by Formula One for the feature race, with points awarded to the top ten drivers and twenty-five points on offer for victory. The points awarded in the sprint race also were changed, with the winner receiving fifteen points and top eight drivers receiving points. The points awarded for pole position and the fastest lap of the race also were doubled.

The winner of the championship was Mitch Evans driving for the MW Arden team, who outscored Lotus GP driver Daniel Abt by two points.

2012 was also the final season that the Dallara GP3/10 chassis package, which débuted in the inaugural season of the series in 2010, was used in competition, as a new chassis package and car, the Dallara GP3/13, was introduced for 2013.

Teams and drivers
Ten teams and thirty drivers had been due to take part in the 2012 season. However, in April 2012 it was reported that only twenty-seven drivers would take place with Mücke Motorsport missing from the grid.

Driver changes
 Changed teams
 Conor Daly, who contested the 2011 season with Carlin, signed with Lotus GP.
 After a season with Status Grand Prix, António Félix da Costa moved to Carlin, a team he competed with at two rounds of the series in 2010.
 Matias Laine switched from Marussia Manor Racing to MW Arden.
 Tamás Pál Kiss, who raced for Tech 1 Racing, joined Atech CRS GP.
 Marlon Stöckinger left Atech CRS GP to join Status Grand Prix.
 Aaro Vainio moved from Tech 1 Racing to Lotus GP.

 Entering/Re-Entering GP3 Series
 Daniel Abt joined the series, driving for Lotus GP, after a season in the Formula 3 Euro Series.
 Alex Brundle competes in the series for Carlin, moving from the FIA Formula Two Championship. He was joined by British Formula 3 driver William Buller.
 Auto GP champion Kevin Ceccon and Irish Fujitsu V8 Supercar Series driver Robert Cregan signed with Ocean Racing Technology for his series debut.
 Cypriot-born British Formula Renault driver Tio Ellinas joined Marussia Manor Racing.
 European F3 Open runner-up David Fumanelli made his series debut, driving for MW Arden.
 After missing the 2011 racing season, Carmen Jordá drives for the Ocean Racing Technology team.
 Jakub Klášterka returned to motorsport after two-year absence, joining Jenzer Motorsport.
 Formula Three Sudamericana champion Fabiano Machado entered the series with Marussia Manor Racing.
 Italian Formula Abarth champion Patric Niederhauser and fellow Formula Abarth driver Robert Visoiu moved into the GP3 Series, continuing their association with Jenzer Motorsport. Both combine GP3 with an Italian Formula Three program with BVM and Ghinzani Arco Motorsport respectively.
  Formula Abarth graduate Vicky Piria became the series' first female driver, after signing for Trident Racing. She was joined in the team by fellow Formula Abarth driver Antonio Spavone, who also competing in Auto GP World Series in 2012.
 British Formula Renault driver Alice Powell signed with Status Grand Prix, and was joined in the team by British Formula 3 Rookie champion Kotaro Sakurai.
 F2000 Series and Formula Enterprise driver Ethan Ringel joined Atech CRS GP.
 After driving for four rounds in Formula Abarth with Euronova Racing, Dmitry Suranovich joined Marussia Manor Racing for his GP3 Series debut.
 Belgian sports car racer John Wartique made his debut in GP3 and single seaters with Atech CRS GP team.

Mid-season changes
 Jakub Klášterka left Jenzer Motorsport between the Monaco and Valencia rounds of the championship. He was replaced by Auto GP World Series driver Facu Regalia for the next round at Silverstone.
After missing the Hockenheim races, Regalia moved to Atech CRS GP for the Hungarian round. Alex Fontana took his place at Jenzer.
 Kotaro Sakurai left Status Grand Prix due to sponsorship problems. His place was filled by Lewis Williamson, who previously raced in GP3 with MW Arden.
 Giovanni Venturini joined the series for the rest of the season from Silverstone onwards, driving a third car for Trident Racing.
 John Wartique was replaced by Fabio Gamberini at Atech CRS GP for the Silverstone round after Wartique's sponsors failed to meet their financial obligations with the team.

Team changes
 The series has proposed amending the rules which mean teams are obligated to run three cars. Under the proposed rule changes, teams will only need to enter two cars, and will have the option of entering a third.
 Addax Team will exit the championship to concentrate on their GP2 Series team, and will be replaced by Trident Racing. Trident started the season with only two cars instead of three, before entering a third from Silverstone onwards.
 After competing as Lotus ART in 2011, ART Grand Prix was renamed as Lotus Grand Prix in both the GP2 and GP3 Series championships, reflecting their increased relationship with title sponsor Lotus Cars. The cars will carry a black and gold livery modelled on the livery used by parent team Lotus F1.
 Ocean Racing Technology replaced Tech 1 Racing.
 RSC Mücke, the Ralf Schumacher-Mücke Motorsport collaboration, indicated to series organisers that they would not be taking part in the 2012 season, reducing the number of cars on the grid from thirty to twenty-seven.

2012 Schedule
The 2012 calendar was announced on 16 December 2011. The series consisted of eight rounds, with a round in Monaco confirmed on 26 January 2012. The series had previously attempted to include a race in Monaco for the 2011 season, but was forced to abandon its plans when it was found that the support paddock did not have enough space for the GP3 Series. The series supported every Grand Prix on the European leg of the 2012 Formula One season.

Race summaries
Carlin's António Félix da Costa qualified on pole position by 0.01 seconds to Lotus GP drivers Conor Daly and Aaro Vainio. However, on the start of the race their team-mate Daniel Abt made a fast getaway from seventh on the grid to lead. But Abt and Félix da Costa both had a jump start and got drive-through penalties. Returnee Mitch Evans, who was behind the two drivers after the start, won the opening race at Barcelona. Status Grand Prix's Marlon Stöckinger scored his first series podium, finishing second. Vainio completed the podium. Conor Daly recouped in the sprint race, claiming his first series win. Reverse polesitter Robert Visoiu and MW Arden's Matias Laine were also on podium.

Two weeks later at Monaco Vainio took the championship lead from Evans after his first series win from pole position in the feature race. He was joined on the podium by Atech CRS GP's Tamás Pál Kiss and Ocean Racing Technology's Kevin Ceccon. Stöckinger, who started from reverse pole, celebrated his first series win. Félix da Costa and Abt completed the podium. The race was noted by two huge accidents between Carlin team-mates Alex Brundle and William Buller, and between Marussia Manor Racing's Dmitry Suranovich and Daly.

The next series stop was at Valencia Street Circuit, where Mitch Evans regained championship lead with win from pole. Aaro Vainio was second, while David Fumanelli scored his first series podium. Like at Monaco the win in the sprint race was claimed by reverse polesitter. This time it was Jenzer Motorsport's Patric Niederhauser, who won the race in GP3 for the first time. Abt and Laine completed the podium.

Prior Silverstone round António Félix da Costa became part of the Red Bull Junior Team and his results increased. He scored his first win of the season, despite start behind championship leaders Evans and Vainio, who joined Félix da Costa on podium. Tyre strategy enabled William Buller to claim the victory in the second race starting from last row on the grid. Daly and Niederhauser completed the podium.

Daniel Abt scored his first pole position on the home soil at Hockenheim. But wet race conditions helped Patric Niederhauser score his second win. Conor Daly and Trident Racing's Giovanni Venturini joined him on podium. Evans extended championship lead by winning the sprint race. He was joined by Lotus GP's Abt and Daly. The race was noted by airborne accidents which left Vicky Piria and Fabiano Machado with injuries.

António Félix da Costa was unstoppable at Budapest, becoming the first GP3 Series driver, who had double win during the weekend. Habitual residents of the podium Abt, Evans and Niederhauser rose again on the podium stages, with Alex Brundle, who joined them for the first time.

Results

Championship standings
Scoring system
Points were awarded to the top 10 classified finishers in the race 1, and to the top 8 classified finishers in the race 2. The pole-sitter in the race 1 also received four points, and two points were given to the driver who set the fastest lap inside the top ten in both the race 1 and race 2. No extra points were awarded to the pole-sitter in the race 2.

Race 1 points

Race 2 points
Points were awarded to the top 8 classified finishers.

Drivers' Championship

Notes:
† — Drivers did not finish the race, but were classified as they completed over 90% of the race distance.

Teams' Championship

Notes:
† — Drivers did not finish the race, but were classified as they completed over 90% of the race distance.

Footnotes

References

External links
Official website

GP3
GP3 Series seasons
GP3
GP3 Series